The 2015 Eastbourne Borough Council election took place on 7 May 2015 to elect members of Eastbourne Borough Council in England. This was on the same day as other local elections and the general election.

Results

Ward Results

By-elections between 2015 and 2019

References

2015 English local elections
May 2015 events in the United Kingdom
2015
2010s in East Sussex